Mammoth Cave is a National Park in Kentucky, USA.

Mammoth Cave may refer to:
 Mammoth Cave (Gibraltar)

 Mammoth Cave (Western Australia)

 California Caverns, originally called Mammoth Cave
 Mammoth Cave (Utah), USA

See also
 Mammoth Cave Baptist Church and Cemetery, Kentucky, USA
 Mammoth Cave Railroad, Kentucky, USA